The 1896 Vanderbilt Commodores football team represented Vanderbilt University during the 1896 Southern Intercollegiate Athletic Association football season.  The team's head coach was R. G. Acton, who was in his first year at Vanderbilt and went on to coach two more. This was the first meeting of Vanderbilt and Kentucky.

Schedule

References

Vanderbilt
Vanderbilt Commodores football seasons
Vanderbilt Commodores football